The International Brain Research Organization (IBRO) is the global federation of neuroscience organizations that aims to promote and support neuroscience around the world through training, teaching, collaborative research, advocacy and outreach. More than 90 international, national and regional scientific organisations constitute IBRO’s Governing Council which, together with the five IBRO Regional Committees, address the needs and advance the work of individual scientists and research communities everywhere. In addition, IBRO has partnerships with like-minded scientific societies and organizations to identify priorities and help bridge gaps in knowledge, investment and resources in the field of brain research.

History
IBRO was founded in 1961 in response to the growing demand from neuroscientists around the world for the creation of a central organization that would cut across world boundaries and improve communication and collaboration among brain researchers. 

The origin of IBRO can be traced back to a meeting of electroencephalographers in London in 1947, which led to the establishment of an International Federation of EEG and Clinical Neurophysiology. A later conference in Moscow in 1958 of IFEEG and other groups, successfully achieved unanimous support for a resolution proposing the creation of an international organization representing brain research worldwide. 

IBRO was established as an independent, non-governmental organization, regulated by a Governing Council. The organization represents the interests of circa 75,000 neuroscientists around the globe.

Quadriennial meeting
In collaboration with neuroscience societies around the world, IBRO holds international congresses once every four years.

IBRO World Congresses: 
 Lausanne, Switzerland (1982)
 Budapest, Hungary (1987)
 Montréal, Canada (1991)
 Kyoto, Japan (1995)
 Jerusalem, Israel (1999)
 Prague, Czech Republic (2003)
 Melbourne, Australia (2007)
 Florence, Italy (2011)
 Rio de Janeiro, Brazil (2015)
 Daegu, South Korea (2019)
 Granada, Spain (2023)

Presidents
IBRO Presidents:
 Hans-Lukas Teuber (1969-1971)
 Alfred Eugène Fessard (1971-1974)
 Walle Nauta (1974-1980)
 Masao Ito (1980-1984)
 Dominick P. Purpura (1984-1999)
 Torsten Wiesel (1999-2005)
 Albert Aguayo (2005-2008)
 Carlos Belmonte (2008-2014)
 Pierre Magistretti (2014-2020)
 Tracy Bale (2020-present)

Publications
Neuroscience is the official journal of IBRO, published on their behalf by Elsevier.
IBRO Neuroscience Reports is an open access journal published by Elsevier.
Neuroscience: Science of the Brain is a booklet for older children and the general public. It aims to describe our current understanding of brain function. Each of the twenty chapters focuses on a different aspect of the brain and is written by leading neuroscientists in that field. It is available in over twenty languages.

Honorary Members
Carlos Chagas
Herbert Jasper
Ivan Solomonovich Beritashvili
John Eccles
Henri Gastaut
Willem Storm van Leeuwen
Klaus Unna
Joaquín Luco Valenzuela
Viktor Hamburger
Liliana Lubińska
Walter A. Rosenblith
Theodore Holmes Bullock
Walle Nauta
Robert Naquet
Derek Richter
Torsten Wiesel

References

External links
 

Neuroscience organizations
Organizations established in 1961
Members of the International Council for Science